The second cabinet of Kaja Kallas, sometimes referred to as the Viljandi government (Estonian: Viljandi valitsus) due to the negotiations of the government coalition having taken place there, is the incumbent cabinet of Estonia.

Background
On 3 June 2022, Kaja Kallas dismissed Centre Party ministers from her first cabinet after several weeks of disputes between the two parties and Centre party voting with opposition against a government supported bill. Continuing with a minority cabinet, the Reform Party called up the conservative Isamaa and the Social Democrats for talks on a possible new coalition. On July 8th, the three parties announced that they agreed on forming a new coalition government. Although law allows ministerial changes without cabinet resignation, Kallas stepped back so that the new coalition got to vote for the prime minister's mandate in the parliament. The new coalition was given a mandate by the Riigikogu on July 15 with a 52–26 vote. This is the fourth time in Estonian history when Reform Party, Isamaa and Social Democrats form the coalition, others being Laar's second cabinet, 1999–2002, Ansip's second cabinet 2007–2009 and Rõivas' second cabinet 2015–2016.

Ministers
The coalition agreed on 14 ministers in addition to the prime minister with five each for Reform, Isamaa and the Social Democrats.

On 18 October 2022, Minister of Finance Keit Pentus-Rosimannus announced her resignation, leaving politics after 19-year career. She also declined return to parliament. On 19 October 2022, Annely Akkermann was appointed as a replacement for Pentus-Rosimannus.

References

External links
Official Website of Estonian Government

2022 establishments in Estonia
Cabinets of Estonia
Cabinets established in 2022
Current governments